is a 2000 children's superhero anime series produced by Sunrise, loosely based on children's book of the same name by author Takashi Yanase. It is directed by Tsutomu Shibayama and written by Masaaki Sakurai and Takashi Yanase. It aired on both Nagoya Broadcasting Network and TV Asahi from February 6, 2000 to September 30, 2001, with a total of 83 episodes (139 segments).

An English dub and Hindi dub of the anime aired on Nickelodeon India.

Story
Follows the story of Nyago, a young cat living in Cat Town, who is chosen to hold the secret identity of Mighty Cat Masked Niyander, a superhero who saves and helps people of Cat Town. He is kind and truthful at heart and is loved by all, but due to this, he has many rivals.

Characters
Nyago/Masked Niyander

The main character, but is actually a young cat who is still an elementary school student. He is a little dull in studies and sports, but as he is caring, kind-hearted and understanding, the Cat Wizard chooses him to be Niyander and help the people who are in trouble. During his transformation into Niyander, his whiskers and tail disappear. His eyes change. He is always ready to help anyone in trouble, no matter who it is. Niyander even helps those who are his enemies when they call for help. Nyago dislikes capsicums. He is the true holder of the magic sword.

Miko/Junior Niyander

Nyago's little sister, and very cute. She loves her brother very much, though she is sometimes strict with him, and wants him to be like Niyander (She doesn't know at first that her brother himself is Niyander). She, like many other people, likes Niyander very much, but is stunned to discover later that her own brother is Niyander. But she gets over it and requests the Cat Wizard to let her help people. He refuses to do so at first, but at last he makes Miko ‘Junior Niyander’ to assist Niyander hence.

Pidori

A brave pterodactyl, and Nyago's closest and most faithful friend. He was raised by Nyago since his birth. Pidori is Niyander's partner in helping people too. In case Nyago is far away from his home or hasn't got his bag (where he keeps his Niyander costume), Pidori brings it to him. But he can only say ‘Pi!’ though Nyago understands him.

Niyon

A blue, mountain cat. He thinks he is a famous hero, but he is not. He has strong traces of honor and greed in his character, but slowly becomes a popular person in Cat Town due to his variety of attempts to become famous. But although his self-centered personality is selfishness, he also has a good and friendly nature. He has no hesitation in helping people when he can and doing good deeds. In appearance he doesn't look much like a cat and has a fine moustache, but earlier he had the appearance of a wild and ferocious mountain cat. Niyon is excellent in inventing things, and he has a machine called the ‘Super Niyon Helicopter’ which runs on waste materials. He wants be in the first rank by outshining Niyander, but it happens only in the final episode. He is blue in color and is shown to like rap rock.

Con

An anthropomorphic white fox, very gentle and soft-spoken. She likes Niyon so she faithfully assists him in all his work. She is convinced that Niyon is the best, and calls him ‘Niyon sir’. She is always quick in sympathizing with Niyon in his failures. In order to increase Niyon's popularity, she consults Ginko her friend for advice. But she is a little impatient sometimes.

Ginko

She is an otter, clever and helpful. She comforts Con whenever she is worried about Niyon. She also has a special ability, which is that she can hit her enemies or someone with a wink punch which causes weakness when it hits, but it does not work on children.

Sarakichi

He is a Kappa, and Ginko's assistant. He has a set of plate disks on his head which he can use as a ‘flying disk’ weapon. But if it is taken away, or if he stays without water for a long time, he becomes unwell. He is a very good swimmer.

Nyanta

He is the leader of Nyago's group of friends. He likes sports. He wants to become like Masked Niyander when he grows up. He teases Niyon saying that he is a fool to think that he is popular. Nyanta is an orange cat with stripes, a little plump, loves bellyrubs and he has protruding teeth.

Nyako

She is a pretty girl of Nyago's class, and one of Nyago's friends. She too likes Niyander very much. She is very neat and tidy, and also very friendly. She is the tallest in her class. She's very good at dancing and singing. Nyako has pretty green eyes, and is white in color except for a dark grey patch on her head and tail.

Kachin

The cleverest cat in Nyago's class, and very patient. She wears glasses and large white coat and has her own laboratory at a shed beside her house. She wants to invent something to help people, like Niyander. She is grey in color, and her coat sleeves cover up her arms.

Suzuko Teacher

She is Nyago's class teacher. Nyago gives many excuses to go out during the class so that he can transform into Niyander, but even though she is puzzled, she is generous enough to let Nyago have his way. Her childhood classmates are Kazaru, Pichiko and Kaberina.

Tama

She is also one of Nyago's classmates. She is very sober and docile, and is quite a hard working person. She likes Nyago because of his good qualities. Tama is also a friend of Niyander.

Charmin

She is Nyago's classmate. She is fat but strong and good in sports, and has a big nose.

Cat wizard

He is the one who gave Nyago the mission of to help people in trouble and maintain peace. He wants to save the world from chaos, destruction, and the evil. He chooses Nyago to help him as Nyago is unselfish and down-to-earth. He first makes him Masked Niyander, and then later makes Miko Junior Niyander.

HeHe Manto

He lives on a mountain at the edge of Niyon woods. He thinks that he is the king of Cat town, and often challenges Niyander. Unlike Niyon, he does not hesitate to be violent. But he is not a villain. His special ability is to create and throw fireballs and lightning from his mouth. He dislikes shallots. He has a collection of flying cloaks, and always wears a black cloak himself.

Tanuko

She is a raccoon, and is very cunning. She helps her older brother HeHe Manto just like Con helps Niyon. She likes teasing Niyon and putting him into trouble. Because of this, she and Con are rivals.

Spider Cat/Kumoneko

Spider Cat is HeHe Manto's servant and can weave sticky threads and webs which can trap people. He also weaves cloth for HeHe Manto's flying cloaks.

Dokuro/Skull King

He is a villain and truly evil. He is very much tempted to unmask Niyander. He wants to conquer the world and make it barren and desolated. Assisted by his monster minions and skull servants, he attempts to do so several times. As he is all bones, he can rejoin his parts even after getting scattered. He tries to possess the treasure sword but in vain. He was once defeated by Niyander and his friends. However he manages to undo the curse and started trying to conquer the power of the four magic balls. But he is trapped by these balls for good.

Chietama

He looks like an egg with two feet. He is actually the caretaker of the four magic balls. He is brave and clever and usually responsible. His name is mistaken to be ‘Chibitama’ by the Skull King several times, much to his annoyance. He admires Niyander a lot.

Ultra Maru/Miraemaru

He is a tiger, and is fond of eating and drinking. Although at first he sets out to outshine Niyander, he later befriends him. He believes in justice and hence helps people in trouble whenever he can, just like Niyander. To do so he wraps himself in bandages like a mummy to hide his identity, and becomes Miraemaru.

Mr. Mike

He is an active reporter of Cat Town's main television channel, or Kamen channel. He has been a movie director too. He is in charge of several other TV programs and announces popularity rankings on a daily basis.

Kazaru

She is a fashion designer. She is a bit dramatic at times, and has strong friendship with Pichiko and Kaberina.

Kabarina

She is a pink hippo. She is a very good ballet dancer and also teaches ballet. She lives in a small house on a lake. As she is very heavy, the ground shakes when she stamps too hard.

Pichiko

She is a slender bird. Her voice is usually too high pitched and she doesn't sing very well. But she plays the piano and the violin excellently.

Pepe penguin

He wants to become a master at riddles. For this he becomes a student of Dr.Hoho. Although he is a penguin he is sensitive and hates cold weather. He easily becomes ill when he undergoes panic, excitement or temperature change. He is usually silly, but has good ideas at times.

Pepeko

She is the little sister of Pepe penguin. She is calm and gentle. She cares for her brother just like Miko cares for Nyago.

Dr. Hoho

He is an elderly owl, and like all of them, very wise. He is good at riddles and providing any sort of information. He is extremely fond of melons.

Dekakongu

A huge gorilla who lives in Niyon Woods. He sometimes causes uproar due to his size, but is kind-hearted and friendly.

Chibikongu

A friend of Dekakongu, and is very much like him in appearance, only smaller.

Gaeon

He is a strong mountain dog who likes to travel far and wide. Due to this he is famous and therefore is a rival of Niyon. He has a good character.

Wonta

He is a young admirer of Gaeon. He is brave and loyal and wants to accompany Gaeon on his travels. He is a good friend of Con.

Paka Paka Kid

He is a cowboy horse, runs very fast and has an accurate aim. He befriends Gaeon later.

Kaako

An old woman who runs a broom shop. She is a sort of good witch. She is the only one besides the Cat Wizard who knows that Niyander and Junior Niyander are Nyago and Miko. She has her own set of brooms which can come alive and are her friends.

Ninja Harry

He is a hedgehog. He has all the qualities of a good ninja. He is a bit cocky and impatient at times, but a good person all the same.

Demonga

He is a Ninja too. He is calm and clever compared to Harry. He was suspected to be a criminal at first but later proves that he was not and becomes a good friend of Niyander.

Music

Opening themes
 Yume no Manto (Ep. 1 – 83/all)

Ending themes
 kokoro no Mori de (Ep. 1 – 32/54 segments)
 Dance DE Niyan (Ep. 33 – 83/85 segments)

Broadcast

References

External links

 Mighty Cat Masked Niyander - Nagoya TV  (archived)
 Mighty Cat Masked Niyander - Sunrise
 Mighty Cat Masked Niyander - Sunrise  (archived)

2000 anime television series debuts
Japanese children's animated action television series
Japanese children's animated adventure television series
Japanese children's animated comedy television series
Japanese children's animated superhero television series
Anime with original screenplays
Animated television series about cats
Sunrise (company)